Video Girl may refer to:
Video Girl (album), a 2009 album by VenetianPrincess
"Video Girl", a song by FKA Twigs from their 2014 album, LP1
"Video Girl", a song by the Jonas Brothers from the album, A Little Bit Longer
Video Girl, a 2011 film featuring Meagan Good
Video Girl Ai, a manga series by Masakazu Katsura
Video Girl Len, a manga series by Masakazu Katsura and sequel to Video Girl Ai
Video vixen, a female model who appears in hip-hop-oriented music videos